Engelbert Bertel-Nordström (19 April 1884 – 22 August 1967) was a Swedish painter. His work was part of the painting event in the art competition at the 1936 Summer Olympics.

Born in Finland, Bertel-Nordström moved to Sweden in 1914.  He married the artist and sculptor Ninnan Santesson there in 1917.

References

1884 births
1967 deaths
20th-century Swedish painters
Swedish male painters
Olympic competitors in art competitions
Artists from Helsinki
Finnish emigrants to Sweden
Naturalized citizens of Sweden
20th-century Swedish male artists